Ningthoukhong is a town and a Municipal Council having 14 wards in Bishnupur district in the Indian state of Manipur.

Demographics

As of the 2011 Census of India, Ningthoukhong had a population of 13,078 of which 6,415 are males while 6,663 are females as per report released by Census India 2011. Literacy rate of Ningthoukhong city is 77.13 % higher than state average of 76.94 %. In Ningthoukhong, Male literacy is around 86.46 % while female literacy rate is 68.32 %. In Ningthoukhong, 12.56 % of the population is under 6 years of age. It's the place from where water for NHPC project is sourced through a canel. Per capita income for ningthoukhong is among the highest one in the state. It is situated at a distance of about 30 km from Imphal along Tiddim Road. Ningthoukhong is a municipality and an important commercial center.

History

Ningthoukhong is also famous for the local deities of the Meitei. Some of the examples are Ibudhou Oknarel, Ibudhou Thangnarel and Ibudhou Panganba. The temples of these three deities are still present today. One of the most important Macha Ebemma temple is situated at Shantipur(Ningthoukhong).The people of Ningthoukhong worship Ima Loktak Lairembi, the goddess of Loktak Lake for prosperous land every year. The Hindu temples such Ningthoukhong Gopinath Mandir and Radha Mandhav are also located in this town.

During the Second World War, Ningthoukhong was the central point of battle between the British located in Maibam Lokpa Ching of Bishnupur (Northern direction) and the approaching Indian National Army (INA) and Japanese soldiers from Moirang (Southern direction). The town was completely destroyed during the war between these two forces. After, Second World War the native people came back and started inhabiting the town.

References

Cities and towns in Bishnupur district
Bishnupur, Manipur